Gilmore Stadium was a multi-purpose stadium in Los Angeles, California. It was opened in May 1934 and demolished in 1952, when the land was used to build CBS Television City. The stadium held 18,000. It was located next to Gilmore Field. The stadium was located west of Curson Avenue, surrounded by Beverly Boulevard, Fairfax Avenue and Third Street.
The Stadium was used in a 3 Stooges 1934 short Three Little Pigskins.

The stadium was built by Earl Gilmore, son of Arthur F. Gilmore and president of A. F. Gilmore Oil, a California-based petroleum company which was developed after Arthur struck oil on the family property. The area was rich in petroleum, which was the source of the "tar" in the nearby La Brea Tar Pits.

Uses

Opening
The first event staged at the Stadium was a series of shows featuring prominent Hollywood actors of the day, led by Screen Actors Guild president Eddie Cantor, on the weekend of May 18-19-20, 1934. This "Film Stars Frolic" sought to raise money for less fortunate Hollywood actors such as extras. [Los Angeles Daily News, May 19, 1934, p.12]

Football venue
The Stadium was used for American football games at both the professional and collegiate level.

It was the home of the Los Angeles Bulldogs, the first professional football team in Los Angeles. The Bulldogs competed as an independent team before joining the second American Football League in 1937 and winning its championship with a perfect 8–0–0 record, the first professional football team to win its championship with an unblemished record. After the collapse of the league, the Bulldogs returned to being an independent team before joining the American Professional Football Association in 1939. The Bulldogs then became charter members of the Pacific Coast Professional Football League in 1940 and played in Gilmore Stadium until 1948, when the team moved to Long Beach, California, for its (and the league's) final season.

The Stadium was also home to the Los Angeles Mustangs of the Pacific Coast Professional Football League. 

Several teams in the Pacific Coast Professional Football League labeled as "Hollywood" also used the Stadium as their home during the early 1940s: The Stars, the Bears and the Wolves.

The Stadium was home to the collegiate Loyola Marymount Lions football team and Pepperdine Waves football team.

Gilmore Stadium was the site of two 1940 National Football League (NFL) Pro Bowls.

1940 NFL All-Star Game (1939 season)
On January 14, 1940, the 1939 NFL champion Green Bay Packers met an All-Star team consisting of players from the nine other NFL clubs in the second NFL All-Star game in history. The Packers won 16–7.

1940 NFL All-Star Game (1940 season)
Extra seating was added to accommodate 21,000 fans for the Pro Bowl for the 1940 NFL season. The crowd set a record as the largest to view a Los Angeles pro game. The event was held on December 29, 1940. The game pitted the 1940 NFL Champion Chicago Bears against an All-Star team from the other NFL clubs in the third NFL All-Star game. The Bears won 28–14.

Baseball venue
The Hollywood Stars of the Pacific Coast League played here early in the 1939 season, while awaiting completion of Gilmore Field's construction. The diamond was situated in the southwest "corner" of the stadium, with right field so close that baseballs hit over the fence in that area were ground-rule doubles.

Midget car venue
While the first modern-day midget car racing program took place at Hughes Stadium in Sacramento, California in June 1933, and Loyola Stadium became the starting point in Southern California in August 1933, Gilmore Stadium is often billed as the first track purposely built for the new style of racing. The track hosted midget car racing from the track's debut in May 1934 until 1950. The 1939 Turkey Night Grand Prix was held at the track.

Rodger Ward drove Vic Edelbrock's midget car in a famous August 10, 1950 event at Gilmore Stadium. Ward shocked the racing world by breaking Offenhauser engine's winning streak by sweeping the events at Gilmore Stadium that night.

Notable drivers that raced at the track include Bill Betteridge, Fred Friday, Walt Faulkner, Perry Grimm, Sam Hanks, Curly Mills, Danny Oakes, Roy Russing, Bob Swanson, Bill Vukovich, Rodger Ward, and Karl Young. Drivers that were killed at the track include Ed Haddad, Swede Lindskog, Speedy Lockwood, Frankie Lyons, and Chet Mortemore.

In the sixteen years of the stadium's existence, over 5 million fans attended races at the track. The stadium drew crowds over 18,000 people each race. Attendance dropped to below 9,000 at normal weekly races by the late 1940s. The attendance drop and increased demand for property in West Hollywood led to the track's sale in 1950. It was torn down in 1951. Some of its grandstand was installed at Saugus Speedway.

Other uses

It also hosted donkey baseball, dog shows, rodeos, and at least one cricket match. Esther Williams performed in a diving and water ballet performance. A temporary above ground pool was constructed for the event. Several professional boxing title matches were held in the stadium. U.S. President Harry S. Truman delivered his "stiff upper lip" speech in the stadium.

Gilmore Stadium was featured in a 1934 Three Stooges short featuring a football game, and fittingly titled Three Little Pigskins. The scoreboard, with the name of the stadium, appears prominently in several shots, as does a billboard advertising Gilmore products. A sign for the nearby Fairfax Theater, across Beverly Boulevard at the north (open) end of the stadium, is also visible in the background a couple of times.

On May 19, 1947, Gilmore Stadium was packed with people waiting to hear a speech by Progressive Party candidate for President Henry A. Wallace. Wallace served as vice president under FDR and was also the Secretary of Agriculture (his specialty) and Secretary of Commerce. Also speaking at the event was actress Katharine Hepburn, whose speech stole the show.

It was there on September 23, 1948, that Ronald Reagan introduced President Harry S. Truman at a campaign rally, the first time that Reagan personally met a U.S President.

References

External links
 Colorized postcard of Gilmore Stadium, Gilmore Field, Pan Pacific Auditorium and Farmers Market 
 A collection of pictures of Gilmore Stadiums various usages

Multi-purpose stadiums in the United States
American football venues in Los Angeles
American Football League (1936) venues
Baseball venues in Los Angeles
Cricket grounds in the United States
Defunct college football venues
Hollywood Stars
Loyola Lions football
National Football League venues in Los Angeles
Pepperdine Waves football
Rodeo venues in the United States
Fairfax, Los Angeles
Demolished buildings and structures in Los Angeles
Demolished sports venues in California
1934 establishments in California
1952 disestablishments in California
Sports venues completed in 1934
Sports venues demolished in 1952